Lithuania participated in the Eurovision Song Contest 2007 with the song "Love or Leave" written by Julija Ritčik. The song was performed by the band 4Fun. The Lithuanian broadcaster Lithuanian National Radio and Television (LRT) organised the national final "Eurovizijos" dainų konkurso nacionalinė atranka (Eurovision Song Contest national selection) in order to select the Lithuanian entry for the 2007 contest in Helsinki, Finland. The national final took place over six weeks and involved three different competitive streams: entries performed by newcomers, semi-established artists and established artists. In the final, eleven artists and songs remained and the winner was selected over two rounds of public voting. In the first round, the top three were selected to qualify to the superfinal. In the superfinal, "Love or Leave" performed by 4Fun was selected as the winner with 23,888 votes.

As one of the ten highest placed finishers in 2006, Lithuania automatically qualified to compete in the final of the Eurovision Song Contest. Performing during the show in position 9, Lithuania placed twenty-first out of the 24 participating countries with 28 points.

Background 

Prior to the 2007 contest, Lithuania had participated in the Eurovision Song Contest seven times since its first entry in 1994. The nation’s best placing in the contest was sixth, which it achieved in 2006 with the song "We Are the Winners" performed by LT United. This was also the only time Lithuania has managed to qualify to the final following the introduction of semi-finals in 2004.
 
For the 2007 contest, the Lithuanian national broadcaster, Lithuanian National Radio and Television (LRT), broadcast the event within Lithuania and organised the selection process for the nation's entry. Other than the internal selection of their debut entry in 1994, Lithuania has selected their entry consistently through a national final procedure. LRT confirmed their intentions to participate at the 2007 Eurovision Song Contest on 23 October 2006 and announced the organization of "Eurovizijos" dainų konkurso nacionalinė atranka, which would be the national final to select Lithuania's entry for Helsinki.

Before Eurovision

"Eurovizijos" dainų konkurso nacionalinė atranka 
"Eurovizijos" dainų konkurso nacionalinė atranka (Eurovision Song Contest national selection) was the national final format developed by LRT in order to select Lithuania's entry for the Eurovision Song Contest 2007. The competition involved a six-week-long process that commenced on 27 January 2007 and concluded with a winning song and artist on 3 March 2007. The six shows took place at the LRT studios in Vilnius and were hosted by Rolandas Vilkončius and Gabrielė Bartkutė. The shows were broadcast on LTV and LTV2 as well as online via the broadcaster's website lrt.lt.

Format 
For the 2007 competition, entries competed in three different subgroups with different numbers participating in each group: newcomers (12), semi-established artists (13) and established artists (10). A separate heat was held for each group resulting in four entries from newcomers, seven entries from semi-established artists and eight entries from established artists that advanced in the competition. LRT was to select a wildcard act out of the remaining non-qualifying acts from the heats, however, four wildcards were ultimately awarded due to problems with the presentation of the voting results in the first two heats. The fourth and fifth shows were the competition's semi-finals where the remaining twenty-three entries participated and the top five proceeded to the final from each semi-final. LRT also selected a wildcard act for the final out of the remaining non-qualifying acts from the semi-finals. In the final, the winner was selected from the remaining eleven entries over two rounds of voting: the first round results selected the top three entries, while the second round determined the winner.

The results of the heats and the semi-finals were determined by the combination of votes from a three-member jury panel and public televoting. Each jury member had an equal stake in the final result and the public televote had a weighting equal to the votes of four jury members. Ties were decided in favour of the entry that received the most votes from the public. In the final, the results were determined solely by public televoting. The public could vote through telephone and SMS voting.

Competing entries 
LRT opened a submission period on 23 October 2006 for artists and songwriters to submit their entries with the deadline on 15 December 2006. A live audition featuring the 65 submissions received took place on 5 and 6 January 2007 in front of a jury panel that consisted of LT United (music group), Zita Kelmickaitė (musicologist), Jonas Vilimas (LTV music producer) and Vilma Kuzmienė (psychologist). On 17 January 2007, LRT announced the 37 artists selected for the competition. The final changes to the list of 37 competing acts were later made with the withdrawal of singers Artas and Vilija Matačiūnaitė. LRT broadcast two introductory shows on 13 and 20 January 2007 that covered the live auditions and introduced the competing artists.

Shows

Heats 
The three heats of the competition aired on 27 January, 3 February and 10 February 2007. The first heat featured the newcomers, while the second heat featured the semi-established artists and the third heat featured the established artists. The members of the jury consisted of Andrius Mamontovas (musician; all heats), Donalda Meiželytė (television and radio presenter; first heat), Linas Adomaitis (musician, singer-songwriter; first heat), Rūta Vanagaitė (journalist; second heat), Vytenis Pauliukaitis (director; second heat), Ilona Balsytė (actress; third heat), Darius Užkuraitis (Opus 3 director; third heat). In the first heat the top four entries advanced to the semi-finals, while the top seven entries in the second heat advanced and the top eight entries in the third heat advanced. Due to technical issues with the voting presentation in the first two heats, four of the entries originally announced to have been eliminated received a wildcard and also proceeded to the semi-finals.

Semi-finals 
The two semi-finals of the competition aired on 17 and 24 February 2007 and featured all remaining entries in the competition. The members of the jury consisted of Arnoldas Lukošius (keyboardist; all semi-finals), Aidas Puklevičius (screenwriter; first semi-final), Andrius Mamontovas (musician; first semi-final), Edita Mildažytė (journalist; second semi-final) and Žeraldas Povilaitis (composer and producer; second semi-final). The top five entries advanced to the final from each semi-final, while the bottom entries were eliminated. On 25 February 2007, LRT announced that "The Fall" performed by Natas had received the wildcard and also proceeded to the final.

Final 
The final of the competition took place on 3 March 2007 and featured the remaining eleven entries that qualified from the two semi-finals. The final was the only show in the competition to be broadcast live; all other preceding shows were pre-recorded earlier in the week before their airdates. The winner was selected over two rounds of public televoting. In the first round, the top three entries advanced to the superfinal. In the superfinal, "Love or Leave" performed by 4Fun was selected as the winner. In addition to the performances of the competing entries, interval acts included Dmitry Koldun performing the 2007 Belarusian Eurovision entry "Work Your Magic", Bonaparti.lv performing the 2007 Latvian Eurovision entry "Questa notte", Olivia Lewis performing the 2007 Maltese Eurovision entry "Vertigo", Guri Schanke performing the 2007 Norwegian Eurovision entry "Ven a bailar conmigo" and The Jet Set performing the 2007 Polish Eurovision entry "Time to Party".

Promotion 
4Fun made several appearances across Europe to specifically promote "Love or Leave" as the Lithuanian Eurovision entry. Between 19 and 20 April, 4Fun took part in promotional activities in Minsk, Belarus where they made television and radio appearances, gave interviews to the press and took part in a press conference organised by the National State Television and Radio Company of the Republic of Belarus (BTRC). On 21 April, 4Fun performed at a concert for the Lithuanian community in Puńsk, Poland. The band also took part in promotional activities in Estonia, Latvia and Ukraine with their promotional tour being supported by the Government of Lithuania which approved a budget of 100,000 litas for the occasion.

At Eurovision

According to Eurovision rules, all nations except the "Big Four" (France, Germany, Spain and the United Kingdom), the host country, and the ten highest placed finishers in the 2006 contest are required to qualify from the semi-final in order to compete for the final; the top ten countries from the semi-final progress to the final. As one of the ten highest placed finishers in the 2006 contest, Lithuania automatically qualified to compete in the final on 12 May 2007. In addition to their participation in the final, Lithuania is also required to broadcast and vote in the semi-final on 10 May 2007. On 12 March 2007, a special allocation draw was held which determined the running order and Lithuania was set to perform in position 9 during the final, following the entry from Hungary and before the entry from Greece. 

4Fun took part in technical rehearsals on 7 and 8 May, followed by dress rehearsals on 11 and 12 May. The Lithuanian performance featured the members of 4Fun performing on stage in black and white outfits with lead singer Julija Ritčik sitting on a stool at the stage centre with a guitar and the other members appearing as silhouettes behind a white screen with blue coloured shades. 4Fun's outfits were designed by Aleksandras Pogrebnojus and Vida Simanavičiūtė. Lithuania placed twenty-first in the final, scoring 28 points.

The semi-final and final were broadcast in Lithuania on LTV with commentary by Darius Užkuraitis. The Lithuanian spokesperson, who announced the Lithuanian votes during the final, was Lavija Šurnaitė.

Voting 
Below is a breakdown of points awarded to Lithuania and awarded by Lithuania in the semi-final and grand final of the contest. The nation awarded its 12 points to Latvia in the semi-final and to Georgia in the final of the contest.

Points awarded to Lithuania

Points awarded by Lithuania

References

2007
Countries in the Eurovision Song Contest 2007
Eurovision